Cosmethella unipectinalis is a species of snout moth. It was described by George Hampson in 1906. It is found in the Solomon Islands.

References

Moths described in 1906
Pyralinae